Andrew McQuistin (born c. 1960) is a Scottish curler, originally from Stranraer. 

At the national level, he is a two-time Scottish men's champion curler, a one-time Scottish mixed champion curler, a three-time Scottish junior champion curler and one-time Scottish senior champion curler.

As of the 1980 World Juniors, McQusitin was employed as a farmer.

Awards
 WJCC Sportsmanship Award: ,

Teams

Men's

Men's

References

External links
 
 The Toorie Band - irish-curling.orgirish-curling.org

Living people
Scottish male curlers
Scottish curling champions
1960s births
Place of birth missing (living people)
Scottish farmers
People from Stranraer